Atte-Oudeyi is an African surname. Notable people with the surname include:

Ismaila Atte-Oudeyi (born 1985), Togolese footballer, brother of Zanzan
Zanzan Atte-Oudeyi (born 1980), Togolese footballer

Surnames of African origin
Compound surnames